Phintella incerta is a species of jumping spider in the genus Phintella that lives in the Mkomazi Game Reserve in Tanzania. The female of the species was first described in 2000 by Wanda Wesołowska and Anthony Russel-Smith. The spider, is small with a light brown carapace, a greyish-beige abdomen that has three stripes, and a distinctive sclerotized epigyne.

Taxonomy
Phintella incerta was first identified in 2008 by Wanda Wesołowska and Anthony Russel-Smith. The spider was named after the Latin word for uncertain. It is one of over 500 species identified by Wesołowska. The genus Phintella was raised in 1906 by Embrik Strand and W. Bösenberg. The genus name derives from the genus Phintia, which it resembles. The genus Phintia was itself renamed Phintodes, which was subsequently absorbed into Tylogonus. There are similarities between spiders within genus Phintella and those in Chira, Chrysilla, Euophrys, Icius, Jotus and Telamonia. Genetic analysis confirms that it is related to the genera Helvetia and Menemerus and is classified in the tribe Chrysillini.

Description
The spider was described based on a specimen found as part of a survey of invertebrates that was undertaken between November 1994 and January 1995. Only the female has so far been described. The species differs from other members of the genus by the design of the epigyne, which is oval with pronounced sclerite. It is a small spider with an oval light brown carapace with black regions around its eyes. The clypeus is similarly brown.

Distribution and habitat
The spider has been found in the Mkomazi Game Reserve in Tanzania, in grass tussocks near a pool.

References

Citations

Bibliography

Endemic fauna of Tanzania
Salticidae
Spiders of Africa
Spiders described in 2000
Taxa named by Wanda Wesołowska